Gabbia may refer to:

Gabbia (film)
The Trap (1985 film)
Gabbia (gastropod)
Gabbia erawanensis
Gabbia misella
Matteo Gabbia, Italian footballer
Cesare Gabbia, Italian rower